Ying Shirley Meng is a materials scientist and professor at the Pritzker School of Molecular Engineering at the University of Chicago and Argonne Collaborative Center for Energy Storage Science (ACCESS) chief scientist at Argonne National Laboratory. 
Meng is the author and co-author of more than 200 peer-reviewed journal articles, two book chapter and six patents. She serves on the executive committee for battery division at the Electrochemical Society and she is the Editor-in-Chief for MRS Energy & Sustainability.

Education and career
Meng studied materials engineering at the Nanyang Technological University in Singapore and graduated in 2000 with a Bachelor of Science. She was a doctoral student in the Singapore-MIT Alliance for Research and Technology (SMART) program, Massachusetts Institute of Technology's largest international research initiative. She earned her doctoral degree in materials science under the supervision of Gerbrand Ceder in 2005, after which she joined Massachusetts Institute of Technology as a postdoctoral fellow.

In 2008 Meng joined the University of Florida as an Assistant Professor of Materials Science. She moved to the Nanoengineering department at University of California, San Diego in 2009, where she also was a professor in the Materials Science Program. She was the founding director of the Sustainable Power and Energy Center from 2015 to 2020. In 2018, Meng was named the Zable Endowed Chair Professor in Energy Technologies. She was also the inaugural director of Institute for Materials Discovery and Design at University of California, San Diego from 2019.

In 2022, Meng joined the Pritzker School of Molecular Engineering at the University of Chicago as professor, as well as Argonne National Laboratory as chief scientist of the Argonne Collaborative Center for Energy Storage Science (ACCESS).

Research 
Meng's research focuses on investigating functional nano- and micro-scale materials for energy storage and conversion by combining advanced characterizations such as titration gas chromatography, cryo-EM, cryo-FIB, in situ CDXI, etc. and first-principles simulations. Her research includes lithium-ion batteries, sodium-ion batteries, all-solid-state batteries, magnetic materials and third-generation solar cells.

Recently, Meng established the analytical method of titration gas chromatography to quantify the contribution of unreacted metallic Li to the total amount of inactive lithium for diagnosing the failure mechanism in lithium metal batteries.

Her research work with her students has led to battery startups spinning out from her lab. One example is South 8 Technologies, a company that is commercializing liquefied gas electrolyte, developed as part of research by Cyrus Rustomji (UC San Diego PhD '15), that allows for lithium batteries to work at cold temperatures.

Awards and honors 
 2002, Systems on Silicon Manufacturing Co. Pte. Ltd (SSMC) Award
 2003, Graduate Student Award (Materials Research Society)
 2008, Early Career Faculty Travel Award (The Electrochemical Society)
 2011, National Science Foundation (NSF) CAREER Award
 2013, Chancellor's Interdisciplinary Research Award 
 2014, Science Award Electrochemistry by BASF and Volkswagen
 2015, Frontier of Innovation Award
 2016, Charles W. Tobias Award, Electrochemical Society
 2017, IUMRS-Singapore Young Scientist Research Award
 2018, Elected Fellow of Electrochemical Society (ECS)
 2018, Blavatnik Awards for Young Scientists Finalist
 2018, American Chemical Society ACS Applied Materials & Interfaces Young Investigator Award 2018, International Coalition for Energy Storage and Innovation (ICESI) Inaugural Young Career Award
 2019, Blavatnik Awards for Young Scientists Finalist
2019, Chancellor’s Associates Faculty Excellence Award for Excellence in Research in Science and Engineering
 2019, IBA2019 Research Award of International Battery Materials Association (IBA)
 2021, Fellow of the Materials Research Society
 2022, Department of Energy (DOE): Clean Energy Education & Empowerment Award

Professional memberships
Electrochemical Society; Materials Research Society; American Chemical Society.

Selected publications

References 

Nanyang Technological University alumni
Massachusetts Institute of Technology alumni
University of California, San Diego people
University of Chicago faculty
Argonne National Laboratory people
Year of birth missing (living people)
Living people